The Dallas–Fort Worth Film Critics Association Award for Best Cinematography is an award presented by the Dallas–Fort Worth Film Critics Association. It is given in honor of a cinematographer who has delivered an outstanding achievement in film.

Winners
 † = Winner of the Academy Award for Best Cinematography

1990s

2000s

2010s

2020s

Multiple wins
4 wins
 Emmanuel Lubezki (3 consecutive)

3 wins
 Roger Deakins
 Andrew Lesnie

2 wins
 Russell Carpenter
 Janusz Kamiński
 Robert Richardson
 John Toll (consecutive)

References

External links
 Official website

Cinematography
Awards for best cinematography